The 1999 Friendship Tournament was the 5th edition of the Friendship Tournament, and was held from 30 October to 3 November 1999 in the United Arab Emirates. Four teams participated: the United Arab Emirates, Estonia, Iraq, and Turkmenistan. Iraq won the tournament.

Participants

Standings

Matches

Winner

Statistics

Goalscorers

References 

Friendship Tournament